Daniel Fasel (born 3 May 1967) is a retired Swiss football defender.

Honours
Neuchâtel Xamax
Swiss Super Cup: 1988

References

1967 births
Living people
Swiss men's footballers
Neuchâtel Xamax FCS players
FC Wettingen players
Yverdon-Sport FC players
Association football defenders
Swiss Super League players